Parliamentary elections were held in Hungary between 28 and 30 June 1931. The result was a victory for the Unity Party, which won 149 of the 245 seats in Parliament. István Bethlen remained Prime Minister, but resigned on 24 August due to the effects of the Great Depression and was replaced by Gyula Károlyi.

Electoral system
The electoral system remained the same as in 1926. There were 199 openly elected single-member constituencies and 11 secretly elected multi-member constituencies electing a total of 46 seats.

Results

The total number of registered voters was 2,549,178, but only 1,907,112 were registered in contested constituencies for which figures are available.

By constituency type

Notes

References

Hungary
Elections in Hungary
Parliamentary
Hungary

hu:Magyarországi országgyűlési választások a Horthy-rendszerben#Az 1931-es választások